Ljubavi (in ) is the fifth studio album by Serbian pop singer and songwriter Željko Joksimović. It was released in all the countries of former Yugoslavia on 2 November 2009. The first single from the album shares the same name with the album.

Track listing

Release history

References

2009 albums
Željko Joksimović albums